Rhian Griffiths (born 30 September 1980) is a  professional Welsh female darts player who currently plays in World Darts Federation events.

Career
Griffiths reached the Semi-final of the 2016 BDO World Trophy, losing to Deta Hedman 6–1. She qualified for the 2017 BDO World Darts Championship, where she lost to Anastasia Dobromyslova in the last 16.

World Championship results

BDO
 2017: Last 16 (lost to Anastasia Dobromyslova 1–2) (sets) 
 2018: Last 16 (lost to Lisa Ashton 0-2)

External links

1980 births
Living people
British Darts Organisation players
Female darts players
Sportspeople from Carmarthen
Welsh darts players